The Gan Ner Sports Hall is an indoor sporting arena located in Gan Ner, Israel, and is the home of basketball team Hapoel Gilboa Galil.

When the arena was inaugurated in 2008 it held 900 seats. The arena was expanded to 2,057 in 2010 to meet ULEB criteria for hosting a game in the Eurocup competition.  The arena has not been approved even after the expansion, as ULEB demand a capacity of 3,000 seats.

In April 2012, the arena hosted the 2011–12 BIBL final four, which saw the home team take the cup.

References 

Indoor arenas in Israel
Basketball venues in Israel
Sports venues completed in 2008